Murray Watts may refer to:

 Murray Edmund Watts, Canadian mining engineer; member of the Order of Canada
 Murray Watts, Christian screenwriter, see KJB: The Book That Changed the World
 Murray Watts (rugby union), New Zealand national rugby union player